Orrin Anthony Barton (born October 17, 1969) is an American retired high jumper.

Barton was born in Washington, D.C.  He finished fifth at the 1992 World Cup, won the 1993 Summer Universiade, finished eighth at the 1993 World Championships, won the bronze medal at the 1995 World Indoor Championships and seventh at the 1995 World Championships. At one time he was the third-ranked high jumper in the world and number one in the United States.

His personal best jump is 2.32 metres, achieved in June 1992 in New Orleans. He also had 8.16 metres in the long jump.

References

1969 births
Living people
American male high jumpers
Universiade medalists in athletics (track and field)
Track and field athletes from Washington, D.C.
Goodwill Games medalists in athletics
Universiade gold medalists for the United States
Medalists at the 1993 Summer Universiade
Competitors at the 1990 Goodwill Games